Boruch Alan Bermowitz (June 23, 1938 – July 16, 2016), known professionally as Alan Vega, was an American vocalist and visual artist, primarily known for his work with the electronic protopunk duo Suicide.

Life and career 

Boruch Alan Bermowitz was raised in Bensonhurst, Brooklyn. Until the announcement of the 70th birthday release of his recordings in 2008, Vega was widely thought to have been ten years younger; the 2005 book Suicide: No Compromise lists 1948 as his birth year and quotes a 1998 interview in which Vega talks about watching Elvis Presley on The Ed Sullivan Show (1956) as a "little kid". A 1983 Los Angeles Times article refers to him as a 35-year-old, and several other sources also list 1948 as his birthdate.  Two 2009 articles confirmed his 1948 birth date, one in Le Monde about the Lyon exhibit and one in the magazine Rolling Stone.

In the mid-1950s, Bermowitz attended Brooklyn College where he studied both physics and fine art under Ad Reinhardt and Kurt Seligmann and graduated in 1960.

In the 1960s, he became involved with the Art Workers' Coalition, a radical artists group that harassed museums and once barricaded the Museum of Modern Art. In 1970, he reportedly first met and befriended Martin "Rev" Reverby.

In 1969, funding from the New York State Council on the Arts made possible the founding of MUSEUM: A Project of Living Artists—an artist-run 24-hour multimedia gallery at 729 Broadway in Manhattan. Producing visual art under the name, Alan Suicide, Bermowitz graduated from painting to light sculptures, many of which were constructed of electronic debris. He gained a residency at the OK Harris Gallery in SoHo where he continued to exhibit until 1975. Barbara Gladstone continued to show his work well into the 1980s.

Seeing The Stooges perform at the New York State Pavilion, in August 1969, was an epiphany for Bermowitz. With Rev, Bermowitz began experimenting with electronic music, and formed a  band that would become Suicide, along with guitarist Paul Liebgott. The group played twice at MUSEUM before moving on to the OK Harris Gallery. Writing publicity flyers under the pseudonym, "Nasty Cut", Bermowitz used the terms "Punk Music" and "Punk Music Mass" to describe their music, which he adopted from an article by Lester Bangs. In 1971, the group dropped Paul Liebgott; for a time it included Rev's wife, Mari Reverby, on drums (although she didn't play at their live performances).

With Bermowitz finally settling on Alan Vega as a stage name, they began to play music venues. Suicide went on to perform at the Mercer Arts Center, Max's Kansas City, CBGB and ultimately, achieve international recognition.

In 1980, Vega released an eponymous first solo record. It defined the frantic rockabilly style that he would use in his solo work for the next several years, with the song "Jukebox Babe" becoming a hit single in France. In 1985, he released the more commercially viable Just a Million Dreams, but was dropped from his record label after its release. The album originally was set to be produced by Ric Ocasek as a follow-up to the critically acclaimed Saturn Strip (1983), but production switched over to Chris Lord-Alge and Vega ran into several difficulties during the recording sessions. The album eschewed many of Vega's experimental traits in favor of power pop songs and he later lamented, "They took all my songs and turned them into God knows what."

Vega teamed up with Martin Rev and Ric Ocasek again in the late eighties to produce and release the third Suicide album, A Way of Life (1988). Visual artist Stefan Roloff produced a music video for the song Dominic Christ which was released by Wax Trax! Records, and Suicide went overseas to promote the album by performing the song "Surrender" in Paris which was aired on French television. Shortly thereafter, Vega met future wife and music partner Elizabeth Lamere while piecing together sound experiments that would evolve into his fifth solo album, Deuce Avenue (1990). Deuce Avenue marked his return to minimalist electronic music, similar to his work with Suicide, in which he combined drum machines and effects with free-form prose. Over the next several decades he would release six more solo records and perform and release albums with Suicide.

In 2002, art dealer Jeffrey Deitch tracked down Vega after a couple of his young gallery employees "gushed" over a Suicide gig at the NYC Knitting Factory. As a result, Vega made a return to visual art, constructing Collision Drive, an exhibition of sculptures combining light with found objects and crucifixes.

Vega's tenth solo album, Station, was released on Blast First Records in 2007 and was described by his colleagues as "his hardest, heaviest album for quite a while." In 2008, British label Blast First Petite released a limited edition Suicide 6-CD box set and monthly tribute series of 10" Vinyl EP's, to mark the occasion of Alan Vega's 70th birthday Musicians who contributed to the tribute series included The Horrors, Lydia Lunch, Primal Scream, and Miss Kittin.

In 2009, the Museum of Contemporary Art in Lyon, France, mounted Infinite Mercy – a major retrospective exhibit of Vega's art, curated by Mathieu Copeland. This included the screening of two short documentary films: Alan Vega (2000) by Christian Eudeline, and Autour d’Alan Vega (extraits) (1998) by Hugues Peyret.

In 2012, Vega suffered a stroke. That, and problems with his knees, led him to focus on less physically demanding art, such as painting, however, he continued to perform at selected concerts and work on the music that led to his final studio album 'IT'. He continued to live in downtown New York City.

In 2016, Vega contributed vocals to the song "Tangerine" on French pop veteran singer Christophe's album Les Vestiges du chaos.

In 2017, Alan Vega's final album IT was released posthumously on July 14 on Fader. The album was produced by Alan Vega, Liz Lamere, Perkin Barnes and Jared Artaud of New York City band The Vacant Lots. The album cover and inner sleeves featured Vega's original artwork. Two posthumous art shows "Dream Baby Dream" at Deitch Gallery and "Keep IT Alive" at Invisible-Exports exhibited Alan Vega's work in New York City.

In 2021, Sacred Bones Records releases 'Mutator', the lost Alan Vega album produced and mixed by Liz Lamere and Jared Artaud, the first in a series of unreleased and rare material from the Vega Vault.

Death

Vega died in his sleep on July 16, 2016, at the age of 78.  His death was announced by musician and radio host Henry Rollins, who shared an official statement from Vega's family on his website.

Discography

Studio albums 
 Alan Vega (1980)
 Collision Drive (1981)
 Saturn Strip (1983)
 Just a Million Dreams (1985)
 Deuce Avenue (1990) with Liz Lamere
 Power on to Zero Hour (1991) with Liz Lamere
 New Raceion (1993) with Ric Ocasek & Liz Lamere
 Dujang Prang (1995) with Liz Lamere
 2007 (1999) with Liz Lamere
 Station (2007) with Liz Lamere
 IT (2017) with Liz Lamere (Posthumous album)
 Mutator (2021) with Liz Lamere (Posthumous album recorded between 1995 and 1997)

Collaboration albums 
 Dead Man (1994) with Mercury Rev
 Cubist Blues (1996) with Alex Chilton and Ben Vaughn
 Getchertikitz (1996)  with Ric Ocasek and Gillian McCain
 Endless (1998) with Pan Sonic as Vainio Väisänen Vega
 Righteous Lite™ (1998) with Stephen Lironi as Revolutionary Corps of Teenage Jesus
 Re-Up (1999) with Étant Donnés, Lydia Lunch and Genesis P-Orridge
 Resurrection River (2004) with Pan Sonic as VVV
 Sniper (2010) with Marc Hurtado (Étant Donnés)
 After Dark (2021) with Ben Vaughn, Barb Dwyer & Palmyra Delran

Soundtracks 
 Sombre (1999) Original score to the film by Philippe Grandrieux

Compilations 

 2006 – Silver Monk Time – A Tribute to the Monks (29 bands cover The Monks) label play loud! productions
 2006 – The Wiretapper 16 free CD issued to subscribers of The Wire and available on some over the counter issues, but not all.
 2008 – Alan Vega 70th Birthday Limited Edition EP Series (covers of Vega's work by Bruce Springsteen, Primal Scream, Peaches, Grinderman, Spiritualized, The Horrors, Sunn O)))+Pansonic, Julian Cope, Lydia Lunch, Vincent Gallo, LIARS and Klaxons.

Bibliography

Notes

References

External links 

 VegA'rt – Art by Alan Vega
 Alan Vega – Infinite Mercy  Slideshow of the 2009 Lyon retrospective.
 Infinite Mercy – Aide à la visite Guide to the 2009 Lyon retrospective.
 Suicide Watch – Village Voice interview for Collision Drive installment (2002)
  Brooklyn Public Library – December 10, 2009.
 

1938 births
2016 deaths
American synth-pop musicians
Protopunk musicians
Musicians from Brooklyn
Jewish American musicians
American post-punk musicians
American experimental musicians
Pantheists
Spinozists
20th-century American painters
20th-century male artists
American male painters
21st-century American painters
21st-century male artists
American performance artists
Sacred Bones Records artists
Elektra Records artists
Blast First artists
Painters from New York City
20th-century American sculptors
American male sculptors
Suicide (band) members
Jews in punk rock
Brooklyn College alumni
People from Bensonhurst, Brooklyn
Sculptors from New York (state)
Thirsty Ear Recordings artists
ZE Records artists